Cheaha may refer to:

 Cheaha Wilderness
 Cheaha Mountain
 Hopeful, Alabama, formerly Cheaha